FSUE State Scientific Research Institute of Aviation Systems or GosNIIAS for short is a State Research Centre of the Russian Federation in operations research and aviation weapons systems development. Founded by the decree of the Council of Ministers of the USSR on 26 February 1946 from a number of laboratories of the Flight Research Institute. The new institute was named NII-2. In March 1994 the institute was re-named with the its current name (GosNIIAS).

Initially, the institute was located in the buildings of the former Sergievo-Elizabethan Asylum.

In GosNIIAS, there are six basic departments leading students and graduate students from three universities:
 Department FUPM MIPT “Avionics. Control and Information Systems. Organized in 1969, head. the department - academician E. A. Fedosov.
 Department MAI “System design of air complexes”. Organized in 1969, head. the department - doctor of technical sciences V. A. Stefanov.
 Department MAI "External design and efficiency of aviation complexes". Organized in 1973, head. Department - Doctor of Technical Sciences A. M. Zherebin.
 Department MAI "Systems of automatic and intelligent control." Organized in 1942, head. Department - Academician of the Russian Academy of Sciences S. Y. Zheltov.
 Department MIREA "Aviation and space information processing and control systems". Organized in 2002, head. Department - Corresponding Member of the Russian Academy of Sciences G. G. Sebryakov.
 Department MIREA "Avionics". Organized in 1988, head. Department - Academician of the Russian Academy of Sciences E. A. Fedosov.

Bibliography 
 List of GosNIIAS publications in the Scientific electronic library  elibrary.ru

Notes

References

1946 establishments in Russia
Defence companies of the Soviet Union
Companies based in Moscow
Metal companies of the Soviet Union
Buran program
Research institutes in Russia
Research institutes in the Soviet Union
Aviation in the Soviet Union
Aerospace research institutes
Aviation research institutes
Aerospace engineering organizations
Research and development organizations
Federal State Unitary Enterprises of Russia